The Royal Sovereign shoal is a shoal, marked by the Royal Sovereign Lighthouse since 1971.  Also known as the Wide Mouth shoal, it takes its name from HMS Royal Sovereign, which was almost wrecked on the shoal.

References

Shoals of the United Kingdom
Geography of England